The Kadavumbhagham Ernakulam Synagogue is the restored oldest synagogue of the Malabar Jews, with a Sefer Torah scroll and offering occasional services. It was established in 1200 CE and restored several times through the centuries on the same site. It is modeled on the earliest synagogue of the Malabar Jews at Muziris from the ancient times of Mediterranean sea trade with Kerala.  The earliest synagogue of the ancient Malabar Jews is today submerged in the sea following the gradual rise of sea level over several millennia. Although the Chendamangalam Synagogue is the oldest surviving synagogue structure in Kerala and Indian subcontinent (established in 1166 CE), its Torah scrolls were taken to Israel by it congregation in 1952.  This makes the Kadavumbhagham Ernakulam synagogue the oldest Malabar Jewish synagogue today (since its restoration in 2018) with a Torah scroll that is occasionally used for services. The Paradesi  Sephardic synagogue at Mattancherry also has Torah scrolls but it was established much later in 1568.

Background

Several millennia of contact and sea trade between Malabar Jews and local traders in Kerala has led to immense cultural exchange between communities. Jewish traders travelled to and fro between the Mediterranean region and Kerala in sea vessels similar to uru boats, a type of dhow that is even today made in Beypore, Kerala, in the southwestern coast of India. The Malabar Jews who settled since the times of King Solomon have intermingled with the natives and share linguistic and cultural aspects with the local people. While the Sephardic Jews that arrived in 1568 have maintained a distinct identity since they are recent arrival. Some of the cultural similarities and exchanges between Malabar Jews and Kerala locals can be seen in language use. For instance 'Tuki' refers to Peacock in Tamil and 'Tukyim' in Hebrew. Likewise in Hebrew 'Metta' refers to mattress and 'Metta' is also used to refer to mattress in Malayalam spoken by Kerala Nasrani Syrian Christians of Kerala. Similarly, 'Tarkam' is the malayalam word for 'debate' or 'oral exchange' derived from the Hebrew Targum (referring to the Jewish tradition of Targumennu) of 'discourse' and 'argumentation' of Targum. Similarly, 'Cheri' or 'Sherry' is Hebrew word meaning 'beloved' and is used as an ending suffix for several place names of endearment. e.g. Mattancheri/Mattancherry. Also, 'Matana' comes from the Hebrew word for 'gift' from which is derived the name Matthai (Mathew), meaning gift of God.

History 

In ancient times, the port of Muziris served as a trading hub between the Levant (Israel, Phoenicia, Rome) and Kerala. This made the Kerala port of Muziri (Muchiri) to become the hub of continental trade between Mediterranean world and Kerala during Sangam era. The Kadavambhagam synagogue belongs to the diaspora of Jews who settled in Kerala during Sangam period when black pepper was a chief commodity being traded, used as preservative for food and other purposes. A West Asian trading post emerged in the ancient Muziris region as mentioned in the Periplus of the Erythraean Sea written by a certain a "Greek in Egypt, a Roman subject" as described by the translator Wilfred Harvey Schoff (1912).

Early modern period 
By the 1300s Arab traders settled in the areas under the control of the Zamorin and this earned the Zamorin significantly more taxes from the larger Arab trading population than the smaller Jewish community. As the Arabs gained more prominence in Kozhikode, the Jewish population began to leave or integrate with the Arabs in the Kozhikode region of the Zamorin. Even today there is a Jew Street in Kozhikode.

Later Jewish settlements moved to further inland regions from Muziris. These settlements were at Chendamangalam synagogue, Paravur Synagogue (Paravur Jew Town and Paravur Jew Street) and the Kadavambhagham Ernakulam synagogue. The oldest tombstone from this community – the tombstone of Sarah Bet Israel is today to be seen in the Chendamangalam Jewish cemetery near the Chendamangalam Jewish Synagogue. This is the oldest tombstone in all of the Indian subcontinent and dates back from around the time of the founding of the Chendamangalam Synagogue in 1166 CE.

Through the 1200s CE a south-side synagogue (Thekkumbhagar synagogue) and a coast side-river harbour side synagogue, the Kadavumbhagam synagogue, was created in Mattancheri and similarly another set of ‘South-side’, Thekkumbhagar Synagogue, and Coast side-river harbour synagogue, Kadavambhagam synagogue, was also built in Ernakulam. Thus there are two sets of Thekkumbhagam synagogue and Kadavambhagam synagogue, one set in Mattanchery and another set in Ernakulam. All these synagogues are essentially built as continuation of the synagogue in Muziris.

The present-day Kadavumbhagam Ernakulam synagogue site is from 1200 CE, although the structure is renovated. The Jewish settlement of Malha followed and a synagogue was established in Mala around 1200s CE as well. This synagogue site still exists and has one of the largest graveyards in India spread across 4 acres. Today the present day Paravur Synagogue, Paravur Jew Town and Paravur Jew Street and the Chendamangalam Synagogue and Chendamangalam Jewish cemetery are all part of the Muziris heritage project.

The Sephardic Jews later came in the 16th century and made a Sephardic synagogue near the Kadavambhagam synagogue at Mattancherry. This Sephardic synagogue is today known as the Mattancherry Paradesi Synagogue and was built in 1568.

Early Muziris 

Periplus of the Erythraean Sea written around in 3rd century BC mentions Malabar coast as Limyrike. Periplus of the Erythraean Sea (53:17:15-27) mentions Limyrike to begin from Naura (Kannur) and Tyndis (Cerobothra, north of Muziris) and corresponds to modern day Malabar coast where Jews had settled as traders in the Malabar coast especially Muciri since the time of King Solomon. The Periplus also mentions Nelcynda (that is today identified as Nakkada near Niranam in Pathanamthitta district) and was once the capital of Ay Kingdom in ancient times. Early Jewish settlements existed in Muziris (present day Pattanam in Kochi near North Paravur (Kochi)) and also at Palayur with ruins of an ancient synagogue. An early Nasrani Palli was established along the Jewish settlement of Paloor (Palayur) as well. The settlement of Paloor is mentioned even in the Kerala Nasrani Syrian Christian Ramban song and as well as Malabar Jewish songs. Old Malabar Jewish songs mentions Paloor as an important congregation for Jewish tradition in Malabar coast of Kerala with synagogue. The ancient Malabar Jews were present all along the Limyrike through Kollam, Alappuzha, Kottayam, Ezhimala, Pandalayini, and most of all in Muziris. An ancient synagogue was said to have existed in Muziris. This synagogue is now believed to be submerged due to gradual rising sea level over the millennium.

There were several rounds of migration of Jews from the Levant to the Malabar Coast of Kerala. These began from 722 BCE after the Assyrian conquest of Israel to the destruction of the First Temple by Nebuchadnezzar II to the fall of the Second Temple in AD 70 to the fall of the Bar Kokhba revolt and then subsequent attacks on the Jewish communities by various groups. The last significant migration from the Levant was after the Spanish inquisition in 1492. The earliest Jewish groups that settled in the Malabar coast of Kerala since the time of King Solomon of the Old Testament are called as 'Malabar Yehudan' (Malabar Jews) and form the original core population of the Cochin Jews. The last group of Spanish Jews that came few hundred years ago are called as Paradesi Jews. Thus there are two main groups of halakhic Cochin Jews – The ancient group of early Jewish settlers (Malabar Yehudan) and the latter group of European Jewish settlers in Kerala called Paradesi Jews. The Cochin Jews were granted copper plates of rights by the local ruler of Kerala. This is said to have taken place in the third century C.E. where in 72 privileges were granted on copper plates. The copper plates were privileges that enabled the formation of a trading guild called "Anjuvannam". The Hebrew inscriptions on the copper plates in possession with Kerala Nasrani Syrian Christians who share common heritage with the Cochin Jews is taken as evidence of the presence of Jews in Kerala since antiquity. Incidentally, the copper plates that belong with the Kerala Nasrani Syrian Christians has the oldest Hebrew inscriptions in Kerala and India. These copper plates have old Malayalam inscriptions and also have signatures in Hebrew, Kufic, and Pahlavi. Hence the Kerala Syrian Christian copper plates are taken as the oldest evidence of the presence of Jews in Kerala and India. In the paper ‘Kerala and Her Jews’, published by Cochin Jewish Synagogue (1984), the Cochin Jewish writers Fiona Hallegua and Shabdai Samuel Koder wrote: "...the Syrian Christian (copper) plates with the signature of four Jewish witnesses in Judeo - Persian, which incidentally is the second oldest inscription in Judeo-Persian in the world, are a few of the ancient relics that can still be seen to remind one of the glorious past of this forgotten outpost of the Jewish world."

In 2017 the Israeli government enshrined a replica of the Kerala Malabar Nasrani Syrian Christian Copper plates in the Israel Museum in Jerusalem. A plaque was installed citing that the Hebrew inscriptions on the Kollam copper plates from the Mar Thoma Syrian Church, in Thiruvalla, in Kerala is the oldest evidence of the presence of Jewish people in Kerala and India.

Malabar Cochin Jewish congregational music occurs in Organum style of music. Even today the song Yigdal Elohim Chai has the same tune in Yemenite Jewish tradition and Malabar Jewish tradition.

Present day

The Kadavumbhagham Mattancherry synagogue is in ruins.  However, the Kadavunbhagham Ernakulam synagogue was restored in 2018. The Sabbath services at the Kadavumbhagam Ernakulam synagogue continued till 1972 when a large portion of the community immigrated to Israel by 1972 along with the Torah scrolls. For decades, the Kadavumbhagham Synagogue at Ernakulam remained without any Sabbath services and without a Sefer Torah. Today the synagogue is nested within the bustling market at Ernakulam with a thriving aquarium in the front area near the synagogue operating since 1985. After much effort, the Kadavumbhagham Ernakulam synagogue was restored and the Sefer Torah brought back to the synagogue in 2018 after 46 years. Today there are only 2 synagogues in Kochi that have Torah scrolls: the Paradesi synagogue of the Sephardic Jews in Mattancherry and the Kadavumbhagham Ernakulam synagogue of the ancient Malabar Jews.

Architecture

The synagogue's ceiling is decorated with intricate carvings. The women's section is located in the balcony area; like many orthodox Jewish synagogues, the synagogue has separate seating for men and women. The Kadavumbhagham Ernakulam synagogue has a bimah and a much decorated Torah ark that is made from wood and is typically plated with precious metal like gold or silver. This houses the Torah scrolls. The ark constitutes the Holy of Holies that is separated only by a parokhet, or curtain. The synagogue also has sanctuary lamp, suspended from the ceiling at the centre of the sanctuary.

See also 

 Judeo-Malayalam
 Saint Thomas Christians
 Cochin Jews

Notes

Further reading 

 Koder, S. "History of the Jews of Kerala", The St. Thomas Christian Encyclopaedia of India, ed. G. Menachery, 1973.
 Puthiakunnel, Thomas. (1973) "Jewish Colonies of India Paved the Way for St. Thomas", The Saint Thomas Christian Encyclopedia of India, ed. George Menachery, Vol. II., Trichur.
 Daniel, Ruby & B. Johnson. (1995). Ruby of Cochin: An Indian Jewish Woman Remembers. Philadelphia and Jerusalem: Jewish Publication Society.	
 Menachery, George, ed. (1998) The Indian Church History Classics, Vol. I, The Nazranies, Ollur, 1998. 
 Katz, Nathan; & Goldberg, Ellen S; (1993) The Last Jews of Cochin: Jewish Identity in Hindu India. Foreword by Daniel J. Elazar, Columbia, SC: Univ. of South Carolina Press. 
 Menachery, George, ed. (1973) The St. Thomas Christian Encyclopedia of India B.N.K. Press, vol. 2, Lib. Cong. Cat. Card. No. 73-905568 ; B.N.K. Press

External links 

Ethnic groups in India
Kerala society
Malayali people
Social groups of Kerala
Ethnoreligious groups in India
 
Jews and Judaism in India
Ethnic groups in Kerala
Judaism in Kerala